Agitation may refer to:

 Agitation (action), putting into motion by shaking or stirring, often to achieve mixing
 An emotional state of excitement or restlessness
 Psychomotor agitation, an extreme form of the above, which can be part of a mental illness or a side effect of anti-psychotic medication
 Agitation (dementia), a symptom of dementia
 Political agitation or demonstration (protest), political activities in which an agitator urges people to do something
 Agitation and Propaganda against the State, a former criminal offence in communist Albania
 Anti-Soviet agitation, a former criminal offence in the Soviet Union

Music
Agitations (album)
 "Agitation", a Miles Davis song on his album E.S.P.
 "Agitated", a Devo song on their album Total Devo
 "Agitated", a song by the band Muse

See also
 Agitator (disambiguation)
 Excitation (disambiguation)
 Mix (disambiguation)
 Restless (disambiguation)

Majority–minority relations